Rocky Point 3 is a Mi'kmaq reserve located in Queens County, Prince Edward Island. In the 2016 Census, the reserve had 51 residents.

It is administratively part of the Abegweit First Nation.

References 

Indian reserves in Prince Edward Island
Communities in Queens County, Prince Edward Island
Mi'kmaq in Canada